The 1985 European Marathon Cup was the 3rd edition of the European Marathon Cup of Athletics and were held in Rome, Italy.

Team

Individual men

Individual women

References

Results
European Cup 1985. Association of Road Racing Statisticians. Retrieved 2018-04-15.

External links
 EAA web site

European Marathon Cup
European
International athletics competitions hosted by Italy
European Marathon Cup